The Sherbrooke Pirates (French: les Pirates de Sherbrooke) was the name of a Canadian minor league baseball franchise in the Double-A Eastern League representing Sherbrooke, Québec, that existed from 1972–73.  Affiliated with the namesake Pittsburgh Pirates of Major League Baseball, the Sherbrooke club played at le Stade Amedée-Roy.

On-field success during two-year stay
The Eastern League's expansion into Québec in 1971, with the Trois-Rivières Aigles and the Québec Carnavals, was initially very successful. The 1971 Waterbury Pirates had drawn more than 64,000 fans — fifth in the eight-team league — and moved to Sherbrooke for 1972. Although the 1972 Pirates posted a winning record in their maiden year in Sherbrooke, they did not make the playoffs and attendance lagged far behind that of the other two Québec teams at 66,100. The following season brought another winning (but non-playoff) team and a six percent increase in attendance, but at season's end the Pirates moved to Thetford Mines, located 104 km (65 miles) to the north.

Notable alumni
Tony Armas
Ken Macha
Mario Mendoza
Kent Tekulve

Season-by-season

See also
Amedée Roy Stadium

References

External links
Sherbrooke, Quebec, Canada, Baseball Reference

Baseball teams in Quebec
Defunct baseball teams in Canada
Defunct Eastern League (1938–present) teams
Pittsburgh Pirates minor league affiliates
Sport in Sherbrooke
1972 establishments in Quebec
Baseball teams established in 1972
1973 disestablishments in Quebec
Baseball teams disestablished in 1973